Mahavajiravudh Songkhla School is a well known educational institution located in Songkhla, southern Thailand.

History 
Mahavajiravudh Songkhla School is the oldest school in Songkhla province. It was established by Chaophraya Yommarat (Pan Sukhum), the governor of Nakhon Si Thammarat, on 27 October 1896 as an all-boys school. The project was funded by donations from residents, and the school was named  as a mark of respect towards the Crown Prince Vajiravudh. The school was converted into a co-educational school in 1995.

Notable alumni 
 Prem Tinsulanonda, Regent of Thailand, President of the Privy Councillor, Prime Minister
 Siddhi Savetsila, Privy Councillor, Minister of Foreign Affairs
 Sophon Ratanakorn, Supreme Court president from 1990–1991
 Anusorn Mongkolkarn, film director, National Artist

References

Educational institutions established in 1896
Schools in Thailand
Songkhla
1896 establishments in Siam